Pandrangi is a village in Padmanabham mandal in the Visakhapatnam district of Andhra Pradesh, Freedom fighter Alluri Sitarama Raju was born in this village.

Geography
It has an average elevation of 23 meters (78 feet).

References 

Villages in Visakhapatnam district